Euseius finlandicus is a species of mite in the family Phytoseiidae. It is found in Europe.

References

finlandicus
Articles created by Qbugbot
Animals described in 1915